Ciclonicate is a vasodilator.

References

Nicotinate esters